John Ashworth Nelder  (8 October 1924 – 7 August 2010) was a British statistician known for his contributions to experimental design, analysis of variance, computational statistics, and statistical theory.

Contributions
Nelder's work was influential in statistics. While leading research at Rothamsted Experimental Station, Nelder developed and supervised the updating of the statistical software packages GLIM and GenStat: Both packages are flexible high-level programming languages that allow statisticians to formulate linear models concisely. GLIM influenced later environments for statistical computing such as S-PLUS and R. Both GLIM and GenStat have powerful facilities for the analysis of variance for block experiments, an area where Nelder made many contributions.

In statistical theory, Nelder and Wedderburn proposed the generalized linear model. Generalized linear models were formulated by John Nelder and Robert Wedderburn as a way of unifying various other statistical models, including linear regression, logistic regression and Poisson regression. They proposed an iteratively reweighted least squares method for maximum likelihood estimation of the model parameters.

In statistical inference, Nelder (along with George Barnard and A. W. F. Edwards) emphasized the importance of the likelihood in data analysis, promoting this "likelihood approach" as an alternative to frequentist and Bayesian statistics.

In response-surface optimization, Nelder and Roger Mead proposed the Nelder–Mead simplex heuristic, widely used in engineering and statistics.

Biography
Born in Brushford, near Dulverton, Somerset, Nelder was educated at Blundell's School and Sidney Sussex College, Cambridge, where he read Mathematics.

Nelder's appointments included Head of the Statistics Section at the National Vegetable Research Station, Wellesbourne, from 1951 to 1968 and head of the Statistics Department at Rothamsted Experimental Station from 1968 to 1984. During his time at Wellesbourne he spent a year (1965–1966) at the Waite Institute in Adelaide, South Australia, where he worked with Graham Wilkinson on Genstat. He held an appointment as Visiting Professor at Imperial College London from 1972 onwards.

He was responsible, with Max Nicholson and James Ferguson-Lees, for debunking the Hastings Rarities – sightings of a series of rare birds, preserved by a taxidermist and provided with bogus histories.

Nelder died on 7 August 2010 in Luton and Dunstable Hospital, taken there after a fall at home, which was incidental to the cause of death.

Awards and distinctions
Nelder was elected a Fellow of the Royal Society in 1976 and received the Royal Statistical Society's Guy Medal in Gold in 2005. He was also the recipient of the inaugural Karl Pearson Prize of the International Statistical Institute, with Peter McCullagh, "for their monograph Generalized Linear Models (1983)".

As tribute on his eightieth birthday, a festschrift Methods and Models in Statistics: In Honour of Professor John Nelder, FRS was edited by Niall Adams, Martin Crowder, David J Hand & Dave Stephens, Imperial College Press (2004).

The first annual John Nelder memorial lecture was held at Imperial College London, on 8 March 2012, as part of the Mathematics department Colloquium series.  The lecture was given by John's long term co-author, Prof Peter McCullagh. An interview with Peter McCullagh, about statistical modelling, includes some reminiscences about John.

Selected publications
 JN and R. W. M. Wedderburn, "Generalized Linear Models",  J. R. Statist. Soc. A, 135 (1972) 370–384.
 McCullagh, P. and J.A. Nelder. 1989. Generalized Linear Models. 2nd ed. Chapman & Hall/CRC, Boca Raton, Florida. 
Lee, Y., J.A. Nelder, and Y. Pawitan. 2006. Generalized Linear Models with Random Effects: Unified Analysis via H-likelihood. Chapman & Hall/CRC, Boca Raton, Florida.

References

External links
 A Conversation with John Nelder
 Photographs

Fellows of the Royal Society
Presidents of the Royal Statistical Society
Rothamsted statisticians
English statisticians
Academics of Imperial College London
20th-century British mathematicians
21st-century British mathematicians
Alumni of Sidney Sussex College, Cambridge
People educated at Blundell's School
People from Dulverton
1924 births
2010 deaths
Rothamsted Experimental Station people